The hooker with a heart of gold is a stock character involving a courtesan or prostitute who possesses virtues such as integrity, generosity and kindness.

Characteristics
The character type is defined by morally positive traits, which are contrasted with the character's employment as a prostitute. The narrative will often provide extenuating circumstances for the character's prostitution, and emphasize her personal decency. Sometimes, the character will be a foil for another female character who reflects negative stereotypes of uptight or frigid women. Per Nell Damon Galles, the character is "the good girl who made one too many bad decisions—losing her virginity, becoming promiscuous, and eventually entering the dark world of prostitution." The "hooker with a heart of gold" has also been described as a "modern 'secular' counterpart" of the medieval sinner-saint.

Historical development
Prostitutes appear in ancient Greek literature as far back as the Archaic period, such as in the work of Archilochus, though initially with little focus on their moral qualities. The good prostitute (or more specifically good hetaira, a type of high-end prostitute)  emerged as a stereotype in middle ancient Greek comedy for example in Antiphanes's Hydria. The good prostitute appeared even more frequently in new ancient Greek comedy. The work of Menander has long been known for its treatment of the trope. Such as in a "much discussed" passage of Plutarch's Table talks where Plutarch commends Menander as suitable for use at Symposia. as the dramatist had his heroes break off relations with bad prostitutes, but sometimes marry them if they were good.

In classical Roman literature, the prostitute was commonly portrayed as especially selfish; the stereotypically bad woman against whom the femina bona (good woman, typically a loyal wife) was contrasted. This stigma against prostitutes largely persisted in Western society from Roman times until at least the start of the 21st century.  Nevertheless, the prostitute with a heart of gold still appeared quite frequently in Roman writings from around the time of Terence; for example in Terence's Hecyra and in Livy's semi fictionalised account of Hispala Faecenia. The Roman prostitute with a heart of gold was however invariably portrayed as an exception to the norm for prostitutes to be selfish and greedy. Unlike the Greek "good hetaera", who could sometimes end up marrying elite men, the Roman prostitute with a heart of gold was expected to know her place at the margins of Roman society, though there were exceptions.

Subsequent development of the stereotype may also have drawn inspiration from traditions surrounding the Biblical figures of Mary Magdalene and Rahab, or to the ancient Indian theatrical tradition of Sanskrit drama where Śudraka's play Mṛcchakatika (The Little Clay Cart) featured a nagarvadhu (courtesan) with a heart of gold named Vasantasena.

In French literature, early appearances of the hooker with the heart of gold occurred towards the end of the 18th century, including  Rousseau's The Loves of Milord Edouard Bromston (1780). These 18th-century works generally had sad endings, showing that despite her heart of gold, the prostitute was typically unable to gain acceptance into mainstream society. Following the conclusion of the French revolution in 1799, there were a few years where various minor novelists published happier tales for prostitutes with a heart of gold, in the then prevailing spirit of egalitarianism. This soon ended after Napoleon introduced various rules regulating prostitution from 1802 to 1804; few hooker with a heart of gold characters appeared over the next few decades. This began to change towards the middle of the 19th century, with various leading French authors including prostitutes with a heart of gold in their writings, such as Victor Hugo's play Marion de Lorme (1828) and novels like Eugène Sue's  The Mysteries of Paris (1843), Honoré de Balzac's Splendeurs et misères des courtisanes (1838-1847), and Émile Zola's Nana (1880). The 1848 French novel by Alexandre Dumas fils, La Dame aux Camélias, later saw many translations and adaptations into plays and movies, in English under the name Camille, and Giuseppe Verdi's opera La Traviata (1853). The original work was based on a real life prostitute, Marie Duplessis, with whom Dumas had a relationship. According to Charles Bernheimer, a French work that most subverted the hooker with the heart of gold stereotype was Auguste Villiers de l'Isle-Adam's Contes cruels - there the prostitute was well regarded while she plied her trade in conventional fashion, but was derided once she fell in love.

In American cinema, prostitutes were generally portrayed sympathetically even from the earliest films, though the hooker with a heart of gold was relatively rare until the 1980s. Some early examples of movies featuring a hooker with a heart of gold are the 1917 and 1918 versions of Camille, and the 1939 movie Stagecoach.  The "hooker with a heart of gold" archetype became most prominent in American cinema during the 1980s. The development of the trope reflected a more lighthearted cultural attitude toward prostitution, which nonetheless overall condemned women for the social transgression of prostitution. The character of Mona in The Best Little Whorehouse in Texas (1982) exemplifies the era's hooker with a heart of gold: a wonderful woman whose goodness is surprising and amusing because she is also a prostitute, and whose love interest berates her for prostitution.  These films have been criticized as akin to sexploitation films for the way they present a glamorized and male-dominated view of prostitution. The hooker with a heart of gold has also been criticised as a "pathetic cliché".

See also
 Counterstereotype
 List of famous prostitutes and courtesans
 Said the actress to the bishop

Further reading

References

Erotic literature
Fictional prostitutes
Female stock characters
Stereotypes of women